The Winter Garden Downtown Historic District is a U.S. historic district in Winter Garden, Florida. On August 1, 1996, it was added to the U.S. National Register of Historic Places.

References

National Register of Historic Places in Orange County, Florida
Historic districts on the National Register of Historic Places in Florida
Winter Garden, Florida
1996 establishments in Florida